James Edward Marshall (October 10, 1942 – ) was an American illustrator and writer of children's books, probably best known for the George and Martha series of picture books (1972–1988). He illustrated books exclusively as James Marshall; when he created both text and illustrations he sometimes wrote as Edward Marshall. In 2007, the U.S. professional librarians posthumously awarded him the bi-ennial Laura Ingalls Wilder Medal for "substantial and lasting contribution" to American children's literature.

Life and death
James Marshall was born in 1942, in San Antonio, Texas, where he grew up on his family's 85-acre farm.  His father worked on the railroad and had a band. His mother sang in the local church choir. The family later moved to Beaumont, Texas. Marshall said: "Beaumont is deep south and swampy and I hated it. I knew I would die if I stayed there so I diligently studied the viola, and eventually won a scholarship to the New England Conservatory in Boston." He entered the New England Conservatory of Music but injured his hand, ending his music career.  He returned to Texas, where he attended San Antonio College, and later transferred to Southern Connecticut State University where he received degrees in French and history.  He lived between an apartment in the Chelsea district of New York City and a home in Mansfield Hollow, Connecticut. He died on October 13, 1992, three days after his 50th birthday. His obituary states that he died of a brain tumor; however, his sister has since clarified that he died of AIDS.

Career 
It is stated that he discovered his vocation on a 1971 summer afternoon, lying in a hammock and drawing.  His mother was watching Who's Afraid of Virginia Woolf?, and the main characters, George and Martha, ultimately became characters in one of his children's books (as two hippos).  Marshall continued creating books for children until his untimely death in 1992 from AIDS-related complications. In 1999, George and Martha became the stars of an eponymous animated TV show, which aired on HBO Family and Canadian YTV.
Marshall was a friend of the late Maurice Sendak, who called him the "last in the line" of children's writers for whom children's books were a cottage industry.  Sendak said that Marshall was "uncommercial to a fault" and, as a consequence, was little recognized by the awards committees. (As illustrator of Goldilocks and the Three Bears, Marshall was a runner-up for the Caldecott Medal in 1989; the "Caldecott Honor Books" may display silver rather than gold seals. He won a University of Mississippi Silver Medallion in 1992. Over his career, he was three times recognized by the New York Times Book Review as one of the best illustrated children's book of the year.) Sendak said that in Marshall you got "the whole man", who "scolded, gossiped, bitterly reproached, but always loved and forgave" and "made me laugh until I cried." In introduction to the collected George and Martha, Sendak called him the "last of a long line of masters" including Randolph Caldecott, Jean de Brunhoff, Edward Ardizzone, and Tomi Ungerer.

Beside the lovable hippos George and Martha, James Marshall created dozens of other uniquely appealing characters and illustrated over 70 books.   He is well known for his Fox series (which he wrote as "Edward Marshall"), as well as the Miss Nelson books (or Miss Viola Swamp, written by Harry Allard), The Stupids (written by Allard), the Cut-ups, and many more. James Marshall had the uncanny ability to elicit wild delight from readers with relatively little text and simple drawings.  With only two minute dots for eyes, his illustrated characters are able to express a wide range of emotion, and produce howls of laughter from both children and adults.

Works

See also

References

External links
 Guide to the James Marshall papers at the University of Oregon 
 Authors and illustrators of books for children and young adults — directory including Marshall 
 Guide to the James Marshall papers at the University of Connecticut
 James Marshall Papers in the de Grummond Children's Literature Collection
 
 Edward Marshall at LC Authorities, with 12 records, and Edward at WorldCat
 Edward Marshall in the German national library (with 2 records likely for another Edward Marshall)

 

1942 births
1992 deaths
American children's book illustrators
American children's writers
Laura Ingalls Wilder Medal winners
Writers from San Antonio
Place of death missing
American male writers
20th-century American writers
Southern Connecticut State University alumni
Artists from Texas
Deaths from brain tumor
People from Chelsea, Manhattan